Treesbank is a settlement in Manitoba. It is located in the Municipality of Glenboro – South Cypress. The Souris River meets and combines with the Assiniboine River at Treesbank.

Unincorporated communities in Westman Region